The Oklahoma Historical Society (OHS) is an agency of the government of Oklahoma dedicated to promotion and preservation of Oklahoma's history and its people by collecting, interpreting, and disseminating knowledge and artifacts of Oklahoma. The mission of the OHS is to collect, preserve, and share the history and culture of the state of Oklahoma and its people.

The society has the rare distinction of being both a Smithsonian Institution and National Archives and Records Administration affiliate.

History
The OHS was formed in May 1893, 14 years before Oklahoma became a state, by the Oklahoma Territorial Press Association. The initial function of the OHS was to collect and distribute newspapers published in Oklahoma Territory. The society was declared an agency of the territorial government in 1895, and it became an official state government agency when Oklahoma reached statehood in 1907. The OHS is both a private, membership organization and an Oklahoma government agency. The OHS Board of Directors is made up of 25 members, 12 of whom are appointed by the governor and 13 elected by OHS members to three-year terms.

Functions
The OHS today works statewide and nationally to preserve and nurture Oklahoma's history. The Oklahoma State Historic Preservation Office, also operated by the OHS, carries out federal preservation programs in Oklahoma under the National Historic Preservation Act, to preserve Oklahoma's significant buildings, parks, objects, and sites. Projects are carried out in partnership with the Department of the Interior and the National Park Service, as well as other state and local governments, groups, and interested people. The society posts markers at historical sites.

Publications
The OHS has published The Chronicles of Oklahoma, the society's scholarly journal, since 1921 and continues to issue four editions per year. The society's monthly newsletter, Mistletoe Leaves, includes information about OHS activities and historical happenings throughout Oklahoma. Both publications and other historical works are available by subscription or per issue. The OHS has also published numerous other titles including The Encyclopedia of Oklahoma Culture and History.

The Chronicles of Oklahoma through 1962 are available online through the Oklahoma State University Library Electronic Publishing Center. The Encyclopedia of Oklahoma Culture and History is available on the society's website.

Archives and collections
The OHS Research Division houses more than 9 million photographs, more than 1 million pages of historical documents and manuscripts, 3,000 oral histories, historic film and video collections, and more than 4,400 titles of newspapers on available microfilm.

Many of the Oklahoma Historical Society's documents and materials are available online at little or no charge, including indexes to the Dawes Rolls, Oklahoma military deaths, the 1890 Oklahoma Territorial Census, Territorial Incorporation Records, Hastain's Township Plats of the Creek Nation, Oklahoma County marriage records 1889–1951, Daily Oklahoman obituaries, and Smith’s First Directory of Oklahoma Territory. The online archives catalog also contains some of the photographs in the OHS Research Division Collection. Historic newspapers are available free of charge on the society's Gateway to Oklahoma History.

Museums and historic sites

Oklahoma History Center
The society operates the Oklahoma History Center, the state's museum located in Oklahoma City. The Oklahoma History Center occupies 215,000 ft² (19,974m²) and contains more than 2,000 artifacts and exhibits featuring hands-on audio, video, and activities. A museum store is available online or at the Oklahoma History Center, and annual membership can be purchased for individuals, families, and institutions.

From 1919 to 1942, Czarina Conlan was in charge of collecting artifacts and documents for the museum from the various Native American tribes throughout the state. The History Center also houses the OHS Research Division, which includes a large Research Center that is free and open to the public.

Oklahoma Museum of Popular Culture (OKPOP) 
In May 2009 the OHS announced plans to build a second museum, to be called the Oklahoma Museum of Popular Culture, or OKPOP, and located in Tulsa's Brady District.  It is planned as the state museum of popular culture, including music, television, film and the performing arts.  After lengthy delays, funding for the museum was obtained through a $25 million bond issue approved in 2015. In late 2016, the society announced that OKPOP will be located on North Main Street, across the street from Cain's Ballroom.

Other locations
The Oklahoma Historical Society also administers a number of state-owned properties either in their entirety or with interpretive centers.:
 Museums
 Cherokee Strip Regional Heritage Center
 Museum of the Western Prairie
Oklahoma History Center
 Oklahoma Route 66 Museum
 Oklahoma Territorial Museum and Carnegie Library
Pawnee Bill Ranch and Museum
 Pioneer Woman Museum and Statue
 Spiro Mounds Archaeological Center
 White Hair Memorial
 Will Rogers Memorial Museum 
 Historic Homes 
 Pawnee Bill Ranch and Museum
 Fred and Addie Drummond Home
 Hunter's Home 
 Sod House
 Will Rogers Birthplace Ranch
Military Sites
 Cabin Creek Battlefield
 Fort Gibson Historic Site
 Fort Supply Historic Site
 Fort Towson Historic Site
 Honey Springs Battlefield
Affiliates
Atoka Museum and Civil War Cemetery
 Cherokee Strip Museum and Rose Hill School
 Chisholm Trail Museum and Horizon Hill
 Henry and Anna Overholser Mansion
Oklahoma State Capitol Museum
Tom Mix Museum

Leadership
The Oklahoma Historical Society is under the supervision of the Oklahoma Secretary of Tourism and Branding. Under Governor of Oklahoma Kevin Stitt, Matt Pinnell is serving as the secretary.

Board of directors
The OHS is governed by a 25-member board of directors. Thirteen of those members are elected by the members of the society and twelve are appointed by the governor of Oklahoma, with the approval of the Oklahoma Senate. All members serve three-year terms. The governor also serves as an ex officio member of the board. The board is responsible for appointing an executive director of the society, who serves concurrently as the state historic preservation officer. The current executive director is Trait Thompson.

References

External links
 Oklahoma Historical Society official site
 The Encyclopedia of Oklahoma History and Culture
 OHS Gateway to Oklahoma History
 Oklahoma History Center official site
 OKPOP official site

 
State historical societies of the United States
History of Oklahoma
State agencies of Oklahoma
Museum organizations
Historical societies in Oklahoma
1893 establishments in Oklahoma Territory
Organizations established in 1893